Bistsolagii Istiqloliyati Stadium, also known as 20 Years of Independence Stadium, is a stadium located in Khujand, Tajikistan. It has a capacity of 25,000 spectators. It is the home of FC Khujand of the Ligai Olii Tojikiston.

References

Football venues in Tajikistan
Sports venues completed in 2009
Khujand